John Donald Feeley (October 30, 1937 – September 18, 2020) was an American college men's basketball coach. He was the head coach at Sacred Heart University for 13 years and at Fairleigh Dickinson University for three. While at Sacred Heart, Feeley also served as the school's athletic director. Feeley compiled an overall coaching record of 285–148, including an Eastern Collegiate Athletic Conference regular season championship in 1981–82.

In the summer of 1983, Feeley discovered 7'6" Sudanese teenager (and future NBA player) Manute Bol while he was playing for the Sudanese national team. Shortly before his discovery, Feeley had been let go by Fairleigh Dickinson due to 'imcompatible' philosophies with the school. Feeley tried using his connections with Cleveland State University to get himself an assistant coaching job, largely with the allure of bringing Bol with him. It did not work out, and Bol eventually enrolled at the University of Bridgeport.

Feeley finished head coaching with a career record of 285 wins and 148 losses. He died on September 18, 2020.

Head coaching record

References

1937 births
2020 deaths
American men's basketball coaches
Basketball coaches from Connecticut
Fairleigh Dickinson Knights men's basketball coaches
High school basketball coaches in the United States
Sacred Heart Pioneers athletic directors
Sacred Heart Pioneers men's basketball coaches
Sportspeople from Fairfield, Connecticut
University of Bridgeport alumni
Yale Bulldogs men's basketball coaches